Little Candles Day or Immaculate Conception Eve is a widely observed traditional holiday in Colombia. It is celebrated on December 7 on the eve of the Immaculate Conception, which is a public holiday in Colombia. This day is the unofficial start of the Christmas season in the country, although the official day is the First Advent Sunday (between November 27th and December 3rd).

On this night, people place candles candles and paper lanterns on windowsills, balconies, porches, sidewalks, streets, parks, and squares; in short, everywhere they can be seen, in honor of the Virgin Mary and her Immaculate Conception. On December 8 it is customary for houses to hoist a white flag with the image of the Virgin Mary all day. They also hold numerous events, from fireworks shows to competitions.

Background 

The celebration of the Night of the Little Candles dates to December 7, 1854, when Pope Pius IX defined as dogma the Immaculate Conception of the Virgin Mary, published in his Apostolic constitution Ineffabilis Deus. In anticipation of this decision, people lit candles and paper lanterns to show their support and belief in this idea.

In Colombia, as in many places all over the world, this announcement was observed by lighting candles. The Catholic Church of Colombia kept alive the celebration and made an annual tradition of lighting candles the night of December 7.

Some places celebrate the night of the little candles several nights before December 8, particularly in the Paisa region.  This is believed to derive from a hanukkah tradition since a large number of paisas are from Jewish descent.

Traditions 

 is celebrated throughout Colombia, but traditions vary in each region and city.

In the municipality of Quimbaya, in Quindío Department the most important cultural event is the Candles and Lanterns Festival (full name in ), which began in 1982 and is held each year on 7 and 8 December. Each of the neighborhoods in the township competes to produce the most spectacular lighting arrangements, and many visitors come from throughout Colombia to admire the displays.

The Quimbayan Christmas Panther is an indigenous figure recognized by native and mestizo communities in the Quindío Department of Colombia. It is believed that the significance of the puma stems from the arrival of ethnically Spanish colonialists from Antioquia in the region during the 1850s. The colonialist's Catholic traditions of using candlelight to celebrate the Immaculate Conception was combined with the belief of the local Quimbaya tribe in the effect that fire had in protecting against panther attacks as pumas and other local faunas are believed to fear fire. It is still a common occurrence to display the symbol of the panther (in the form of sculptures made of terra cotta, cloth, plastic, etc.) in conjunction with the lighting of candles on the night of December 7th. Such religious syncretism is especially visible in the rural pueblos of Quindio where many residents claim full or partial descent from Quimbaya native peoples of the region.

In Bogotá, the Christmas decorations reach their peak on this day; the city, fully decorated, plans late activities for the whole family since most Colombians would be out and about admiring the shows, many streets close to traffic and allow pedestrians to walk freely and stop to admire the light arrangements. Malls, museums, stores, and other public places have extended hours of operation. There are many shows that take place on this night, live nativity scenes, caroling events, among others.

In the Caribbean region of Colombia, the lighting of candles and lanterns takes place in the early hours of December 8, before sunrise, instead of the night before. Devout Catholics wake up before sunrise and light candles with their family members. Many people decide to stay up all night and party in celebration and light the candles sometimes before they retreat to bed.
Families meet to celebrate the day and along with lighting the candles, there is abundant food and drinks. An evening that brings extended families groups together to talk during the evening.

In Cali, Valle del Cauca people also walk along the Cali River which is illuminated for the season.

See also
 Novena

References

Cruz, J. M. (2014). Colombia. In The Histories of the Latin American Church: A Handbook (pp. 244). 1517 Media. https://doi.org/10.2307/j.ctt9m0t2k.16

External links
 Photos of the Night of Little Candles (Imagenes del dia de las velitas)

Catholic holy days
Christmas-linked holidays
Colombian culture
December observances
Religion in Colombia
Religious festivals in Colombia
Candles